The Security Force Assistance Command (SFAC) is a division-level command element for the United States Army's new security force assistance brigades (SFAB).  These units' core mission is Security force assistance to conduct training, advising, assisting, enabling and accompanying operations with allied and partner nations.

History
SFAB has its roots in Special Forces training and doctrine.  The original Military Assistance Training Advisor (MATA) course was established in 1962 as part of the U.S. Army Special Warfare School.  It prepared conventional U.S. Army officers and Non-Commissioned Officers (NCOs) for assignments as advisors to Vietnamese Army units.  Instructors were Special Forces NCOs who were trained in conducting Foreign Internal Defense (FID) missions.  One notable feature of the school was the “MATA Mile” – a running course through the woods alongside Gruber Road at Fort Bragg. Students were provided with ST 31-179, MATA Handbook for Vietnam (January 1966).  The SFABs carry on the FID mission of conventional foreign forces today.

Overview

The SFAC is an U.S. Army command which groups and coordinates the SFABs. The mission of the SFAB is to carry out train, advise, and assist (TAA) missions overseas with foreign nation military partners. SFABs are the United States Army's latest, and most potent solution to providing dedicated and trained personnel to relieve the Brigade Combat Teams from performing combat advisory missions.  Prior to the formation of SFABs, the combat advisory role was filled by NCOs and Officers detailed from the Brigade Combat Teams to train host nation military forces; leaving critical leadership billets unfilled. The introduction of the SFAB concept is intended to relieve the Brigade Combat Teams of the combat advisory mission and enable them to focus on their primary combat mission. 
 Operating in units with roughly 800 personnel, SFABs are designed to be versatile and deployable worldwide and are made up exclusively of non-commissioned officers and commissioned officers however E-4s with promotable status are accepted and receive promotion to sergeant (E-5) upon graduation of MATA.

SFABs are conventional units composed of volunteers recruited from units across the Regular Army. Volunteers undergo a week-long assessment and selection program at Fort Benning, GA which evaluates a candidate's physical fitness, decision-making, problem solving, and communications skills as well as their ethics and morals. Candidates that complete the assessment and selection program are assigned to an active SFAB, where they will be scheduled to attend the MATA and other follow on courses specific to their MOS.Trainees may receive additional language training, culture training, foreign weapons training and medical training, among other topics.
 The SFABs are equipped with secure, but unclassified communications gear, utilizing T2C2 systems.

SFAB organizational structure

References

Military units and formations established in 2018
Commands of the United States Army
Military advisory groups